Lobiger is a genus of small sea snails, marine gastropod mollusks in the family Oxynoidae.

Species 
Species within the genus Lobiger include the following species:
 Lobiger nevilli Pilsbry, 1896
 Lobiger sagamiensis Baba, 1952
 Lobiger serradifalci (Calcara, 1840)
 Lobiger souverbii Fischer, 1856
 Lobiger viridis Pease, 1863 - nomen nudum: Lobiger nevilli Pilsbry, 1896

Note: Malacolog Version 4.1.1. claims Lobiger viridis as a synonym for Lobiger serradifalci.

Invalid species named Lobiger include:
 Lobiger corneus Mörch, 1863
 Lobiger cumingi (A. Adams, 1850)
 Lobiger pellucidus A. Adams, 1854
 Lobiger philippi Krohn, 1847  : synonym of Lobiger serradifalci (Calcara, 1840)
 Lobiger pilsbryi Schwengel, 1941
 Lobiger picta Pease, 1868
 Lobiger viridis Nevill & Nevill, 1869
 Lobiger wilsoni Tate, 1889 : synonym of Roburnella wilsoni (Tate, 1889)

References

External links 
 Bibliography about genus Lobiger

Oxynoidae
Taxa named by August David Krohn